Jaylyn Agnew (born July 21, 1997) is an American professional basketball player who is currently a free agent. She played college basketball for the Creighton Bluejays.

High school career
Agnew played high school basketball for Andover High School. In her sophomore season, she averaged 13.3 points per game and shot 53 percent from the field. In her junior year, she averaged 14.3 points per game and lead the her team to a 17–6 record. In her senior year, she averaged 17.4 points per game and she was a three-time conference MVP for her high school.

College career
Agnew played college basketball for the Creighton Bluejays from 2016 to 2020. In her freshman season, she averaged 7.1 points, 3.5 rebounds and 1.5 assists per game and was named Big East Freshman of the Year. In her sophomore season, she averaged 14.5 points, 6.3 rebounds and 2.6 assists per game. In her junior year, she averaged 11.8 points, 6.6 rebounds and 3.2 assists per game. In her senior year, she averaged 20.8 points, 6.3 rebounds and 3.3 assists per game and she was named the Big East Player of the Year. She went on to become Creighton's first WNBA draft pick.

Creighton statistics

Source

Professional career
On April 17, 2020, the Washington Mystics selected Agnew as the 24th pick in the 2020 WNBA Draft. After being waived by the Mystics to finalize rosters, Agnew was signed by the Dream in June 2020.

In 2020, she signed with Spartak Vidnoye Moscow Region (aka WBC Sparta&K)

WNBA career statistics

Regular season

|-
| style="text-align:left;"| 2020
| style="text-align:left;"| Atlanta
| 12 || 0 || 5.9 || .267 || .231 || .800 || 0.4 || 0.3 || 0.0 || 0.0 || 0.4 || 1.3
|-
| style="text-align:left;"| Career
| style="text-align:left;"|1 year, 1 team
| 12 || 0 || 5.9 || .267 || .231 || .800 || 0.4 || 0.3 || 0.0 || 0.0 || 0.4 || 1.3

References

1997 births
Living people
American women's basketball players
Atlanta Dream players
Basketball players from Kansas
Creighton Bluejays women's basketball players
People from Andover, Kansas
Washington Mystics draft picks